Jack Gilmore was a former Australian professional soccer player who played as a forward for NSW club Weston and the Australia national soccer team.

Early life
Jack Gilmore was born in Northumberland, England in 1894. He migrated from England to Australia in 1913, at age 18. He was a worker in the mines and was playing local soccer. He was a service in the Middle East and Flanders in the first world war.

He spent his entire family life in Abermain as he enjoyed playing soccer locally at Weston playing for the Weston Workers Bears. When playing for the club, the club formed nickname for notable players called the "Geordie" players. Jack earned the nickname "Terror of the Geordies" for his attacking skill.

International career
Gilmore began his international career with Australia in June 1923 on their second historic tour against New Zealand, debuting in a 2–3 loss to New Zealand scoring his first goal on debut. He became the first player based at Weston to play an international match for Australia. He played once more, a year after in 1924 against Canada in a 0–0 draw.

Career statistics

International

Scores and results list Australia's goal tally first, score column indicates score after each Australia goal.

References

Australian soccer players
Association football forwards
Australia international soccer players
1894 births
Year of death missing
British emigrants to Australia